Jiří Vozák (born October 31, 1962) is a Czech retired ice hockey player and coach.

He coached the Czech women's national team at the 2016 IIHF Women's World Championship.

References

External links

1962 births
Living people
Czech ice hockey forwards
Czech ice hockey coaches
HC Litvínov players
Piráti Chomutov players
HC Bílí Tygři Liberec players
Czechoslovak ice hockey forwards